The Women's 3 m springboard competition of the 2016 European Aquatics Championships was held on 14 May 2016.

Results
The preliminary round was held at 10:00. The final was held at 15:30.

Green denotes finalists

References

Diving